is a railway station on the Nemuro Main Line of JR Hokkaido located in Furano, Hokkaidō, Japan. The station opened on December 26, 1927.

Railway stations in Hokkaido Prefecture
Stations of Hokkaido Railway Company
Railway stations in Japan opened in 1927